UDP-4-amino-4,6-dideoxy-N-acetyl-beta-L-altrosamine N-acetyltransferase  (PseH) is an enzyme with systematic name acetyl-CoA:UDP-4-amino-4,6-dideoxy-N-acetyl-beta-L-altrosamine N-acetyltransferase. This enzyme catalyses the following chemical reaction

 acetyl-CoA + UDP-4-amino-4,6-dideoxy-N-acetyl-beta-L-altrosamine  CoA + UDP-2,4-bis(acetamido)-2,4,6-trideoxy-beta-L-altropyranose

This enzyme is isolated from Helicobacter pylori.

References

External links 
 

EC 2.3.1